At least two vessels of the Royal Navy have borne the name HMS Bream after the common European food and game fish (Abramis brama) of the carp family Cyprinidae:

  was a  launched in 1807 and sold in 1816.
  was a  anti-submarine warfare trawler during World War II.

Royal Navy ship names